The 7th Filipino Academy of Movie Arts and Sciences Awards Night was held on March 7, 1959, for the Outstanding Achievements for the year 1958.

Hanggang sa Dulo ng Daigdig under the Pacific Movie Productions won the most coveted FAMAS Award for Best Picture award.  It also won the best director award, best screenplay, best editing, best cinematography and the best actor award for its lead star Pancho Magalona.  On the other hand, Talipandas has the most nominations with 12, winning only 1 for its lead star, screen legend Rita Gomez.

Awards

Major Awards
Winners are listed first and highlighted with boldface.

Special Awardee

International Prestige Award of Merit 
Badjao (LVN Pictures)
Dr. Ciriaco Santiago Memorial Award 
Susan Roces

Short Film 
Gerilyang Patpat (LVN Pictures)

References

External links
FAMAS Awards 

FAMAS Award
FAMAS
FAMAS